Slave to the Sound is the fourth studio album by Swedish singer Denise Lopez released in Japan under the title "Like a Queen" (Epic) in July 2002, and by Applalosa Entertainment AB in Sweden in May 2003. The album included the two singles "Last to Know" which featured Laila Adele, and "Love Me Down" both of which music video was made for. "Slave to the Sound" contained 16 new tracks and was the first to be released under Denise's own label.

Denise has co-written all songs but 5 tracks. Two of the songs ("Sex Dice" and "Karma Sutra") was written by famous singer Dannii Minogue. The album failed to enter the charts worldwide.

Track listing 
 "Slave to the Sound" – 3:22
 "Love Me Down" – 3:28
 "Sex Dice" (Dannii Minogue, Lopez) – 3:09
 "Karma Sutra" (Minogue, Lopez) – 4:00
 "I Don't Need You Anymore" – 3:24
 "Masterplan" – 3:13
 "Like a Queen" – 3:11
 "Come with Me" – 3:26
 "Mirror Mirror" – 3:01
 "Shake Down" – 2:57
 "Love on Line" – 3:08
 "Last to Know" – 3:12
 "More than a Game" – 3:11
 "Say that You Want It" – 4:01
 "Just Get It Over With" – 3:21
 "Someone, Somewhere, Someday" – 2:55

Release history

References 
Slave to the Sound - Discogs

External links 

 Official website

2003 albums